Willie Hill may refer to:

 Willie Hill (football player)
 Willie Hill (bishop), born 1951

See also
William Hill (disambiguation)